Perundurai Road is one of the major arterial roads in the city of Erode in India. Running from East to West of the city, the road starts from Amma Flyover near Thanthai Periyar Government Hospital and terminates near the western suburb Perundurai. This 17 km stretch of this road further extends to the west connecting SIPCOT Industrial Park and enables further connectivity to Coimbatore and Kochi as NH 544. The commercial and residential establishments along this road make it as the growth identifier of Erode, forecasting the development towards the west. The width of the road is making it four-lane to most of the stretch while few km near the western end is wider to six-lane carriageway.

Important places and Landmarks

 GH Flyover
 Kalingarayan Bungalow
 District Collector's Office
 Reliance Hyper Mall
 Erode West MLA Office
 Thindal Murugan Temple
 Vellalar College for Women
 Kongu Arts and Science College
 Nandha Engineering College
 Erode Rural Sub-division Police DSP Office
 Perundurai Bus Station
 Perundurai SIPCOT Industrial Park
 Palanisamy College of Arts and Science

Hospitals 
Several major Hospitals of the city were located along this stretch. During 2020 coronavirus pandemic in Tamil Nadu, all the four notified private hospitals for treatment were located along this stretch apart from the Government run Erode Medical College Hospital.

 Thanthai Periyar Government Hospital
 KMCH Speciality Hospital
 Maaruthi Medical Center & Hospital
 Sudha Hospitals
 Erode Medical Center & Hospitals
 Care 24 Medical Center & Hospitals
 Erode Cancer Center
 Nandha Siddha Medical College & Hospital
 Perundurai Government Hospital

Elevated corridor 
Considering the traffic congestion in this stretch, a plan for construction of Elevated Corridor has been announced by Government of Tamil Nadu in 2018. This Elevated Corridor has been planned for a length of 5.4km starting from Kalingarayan Illam and terminating near Thindalmedu Ring Road intersection.

References 

Roads in Tamil Nadu
Transport in Erode